Syzygium leucoxylon is a species of plant in the family Myrtaceae, that grows in the tropical peat swamp forest of Sarawak and Kalimantan. The species was described in 1848 by botanist Pieter Willem Korthals from specimens found growing on the mountain Gunung Pamaton, in Borneo.

References

leucoxylon
Flora of Borneo